The court officials of the Kingdom of Georgia, were in charge of the royal court. 

The chronological lists below are not exhaustive, since there exist large gaps in the historical record.

Majordomo 
The majordomo (Georgian: msakhurtukhutsesi) was the chief official of the court.

Chancellor 
The Chancellor (Georgian: mtsignobartukhutsesi) was the head of the government.

Treasurer 
The treasurer (Georgian: mechurchletukhutsesi) was the official responsible for running the treasury.

Master of ceremonies 
The master of ceremonies (Georgian: mandaturtukhutsesi) was responsible for conducting ceremonies such as coronations and receptions of foreign ambassadors.

Marshal
The marshal (Georgian: amirspasalar) had charge of the royal stables.

Tutor 
The tutor (Georgian: atabeg) came to be denominated as Samtskhe-Saatabago, the latter element meaning "of the atabags".

Feudal office/title 
Spaspet
Tavadi

Notes

Sources
ცენტრალური და ადგილობრივი სამოხელეო წყობა შუა საუკუნეების საქართველოში

Kingdom of Georgia
Lists of office-holders